USS Mary Louise (SP-356) was a patrol boat that served in the United States Navy from August to October 1917.
 
Mary Louise was built as a private boat of the same name in by the Milton Point Shipyard in New York. On 24 August 1917, the U.S. Navy acquired her on a free-lease basis from her owner, J. S. Williams of Wilmington, North Carolina, for use as a patrol boat during World War I. She was placed in service as USS Mary Louise (SP-356) on 27 August 1917.

Assigned to the 6th Naval District, Mary Louise served on section patrol duties for about two months.

Mary Louise was returned to her owner on 30 October 1917.

References
 
 NavSource Online: Section Patrol Craft Photo Archive: Mary Louise (SP 356)

Patrol vessels of the United States Navy
World War I patrol vessels of the United States
Ships built in New York City